Mithi Vav is a stepwell located in Palanpur town of Banaskantha district, Gujarat, India. It is considered the only surviving monument of Parmara rule in the town. It was built around the 8th century. It is situated in the eastern part of the town. The five storey stepwell can be entered from the west. Based on its architectural style, it is believed that it is constructed in late medieval period but the sculptures embedded in the walls may belong to earlier period. The sculptures include that of Ganesha, Shiva, Apsaras, dancing figures, worshiping couples and floral or geometrical patterns. A worn out inscription found on one sculpture embedded in left wall cannot be read clearly, but the year Samvat 1320 (1263 AD) can made out.

Gallery

References 

Stepwells in Gujarat
Tourist attractions in Banaskantha district
Buildings and structures completed in the 8th century